Henry Morris (25 August 1900–1964) was an English footballer who played in the Football League for Crewe Alexandra, Hartlepools United  and Wigan Borough.

References

1900 births
1964 deaths
English footballers
Association football midfielders
English Football League players
Prescot Cables F.C. players
Manchester United F.C. players
Hartlepool United F.C. players
Wigan Borough F.C. players
Crewe Alexandra F.C. players